Eneko Sagardoy Mujika (born 17 January 1994) is a Spanish actor who became known for his performances in Basque language works.

Biography 
Eneko Sagardoy Mujika was born in Durango, Biscay, on 17 January 1994.

After his beginnings in performing arts taking part in his school's stage plays, he joined the cast of Basque soap opera Goenkale at age 18. He studied a degree in audiovisual communication at Mondragon University. His performance as a 2.42 metre tall freak show attraction (he actually stands at just 1.84 m) in Giant earned him the Goya Award for Best New Actor in 2018.

Accolades

References 

Actors from the Basque Country (autonomous community)
Basque-language actors
21st-century Spanish male actors
Spanish male television actors
Spanish male film actors
1994 births
Living people